Def Jam's Rush Hour Soundtrack is the soundtrack to Brett Ratner's 1998 action comedy film Rush Hour. It was released on September 15, 1998 through Rush Associated Labels and consisted of hip hop and R&B music. The soundtrack was a huge success, peaking at 5 on the Billboard 200 and 2 on the Top R&B/Hip-Hop Albums, and spawned the number 1 single "How Deep Is Your Love". The soundtrack was certified Gold by the Recording Industry Association of America on October 15, 1998, and platinum on January 21, 1999. The tracks "Fantasy" by Mariah Carey and "Another Part of Me" by Michael Jackson are not on the soundtrack, despite being heard in the film.

Track listing

Rush Hour (Original Film Score)

Rush Hour (Original Film Score) is the original film score album of Brett Ratner's 1998 action comedy film Rush Hour composed and conducted by Lalo Schifrin. It was released on October 13, 1998 through Aleph Records. Recording sessions took place at Newman Scoring Stage at 20th Century Fox Studios in Hollywood. Production was handled by Schifrin and Ratner with Donna Schifrin serving as executive producer. The album was nominated for Best Instrumental Composition Written for a Motion Picture or for Television at the 41st Annual Grammy Awards.

Track listing

Charts

Weekly charts

Year-end charts

Certifications

References

External links

Hip hop soundtracks
Rush Hour (franchise)
1998 soundtrack albums
Action film soundtracks
Comedy film soundtracks
Albums produced by Soopafly
Albums produced by Irv Gotti
Rhythm and blues soundtracks
Albums produced by Dame Grease
Def Jam Recordings soundtracks
Albums produced by Vincent Herbert
Albums produced by Warryn Campbell
Lalo Schifrin soundtracks
Albums conducted by Lalo Schifrin